Benoît Violier (22 August 1971 – 31 January 2016) was a French-Swiss chef .

Violier owned the three Michelin star Restaurant de l'Hôtel de Ville in a suburb of Lausanne, Switzerland from 2012 to his death. The establishment topped the first La Liste in December 2015.

Biography
Born in Saintes, Charente-Maritime, France, he went to Paris in 1991 to study with Joël Robuchon, Benoît Guichard and others. Violier moved to Switzerland in 1996 to work with Philippe Rochat. Upon Rochat's retirement in 2012, Violier began running the restaurant. He applied for Swiss citizenship in 2014. He specialised in cooking game.

Death
Violier died at home in Crissier, Switzerland, of a self-inflicted gunshot wound on 31 January 2016, aged 44. Violier's suicide prompted shock and confusion, as Violier's restaurant Le Restaurant de l'Hôtel de Ville had been crowned by the French government as the best restaurant in the world only a month before, leading the media to hail Violier as "the world's best chef." It also drew attention to the high-pressure world of haute cuisine.

Swiss media subsequently reported that Violier may have been a victim of a fraud in which individual bottles of wine were sold several times; however, the management of his restaurant denied that Violier had any connection with the fraud.

Food gallery

References

1971 births
2016 deaths
French chefs
Swiss chefs
French restaurateurs
Suicides by firearm in Switzerland
People from Saintes, Charente-Maritime
Naturalised citizens of Switzerland
French emigrants to Switzerland
2016 suicides